The 1931 Idaho Vandals football team represented the University of Idaho in the 1931 college football season. The Vandals were led by third-year head coach Leo Calland, and were members of the Pacific Coast Conference. Home games were played on campus in Moscow at MacLean Field, with none in Boise this season.

Idaho compiled a  overall record and lost all but one of its five games in the PCC. The Vandals were led on the field by undersized sophomore quarterback Wee Willie Smith, then known as "Little Giant" Willis Smith  Three years later in 1934, he was a backup in the NFL with the New York Giants in their championship season.

In the Battle of the Palouse with neighbor Washington State, the Vandals suffered a fourth straight loss, falling by one point at Rogers Field in Pullman on  Idaho's most recent win in the series was six years earlier in 1925 and the next was 23 years away in 1954.

Schedule

 The Little Brown Stein trophy for the Montana game debuted seven years later in 1938

All-conference
No Vandals were named to the All-Coast team; honorable mention were center Arthur Spaugy, guard Elmer Martin, and sophomore quarterback Willis Smith.

References

External links
Gem of the Mountains: 1932 University of Idaho yearbook – 1931 football season
Go Mighty Vandals – 1931 football season
Official game program: Idaho at Washington State –  November 7, 1931
Idaho Argonaut – student newspaper – 1931 editions

Idaho
Idaho Vandals football seasons
Idaho Vandals football